George IX may refer to:

 George IX of Kartli (d. 1539), a king of the Georgian kingdom of Kartli
 George IX of Imereti (1712–post-1772), a king of the Georgian kingdom of Imereti

See also
 King George (disambiguation)